NMM may refer to:

 National Music Museum, a musical instrument museum in Vermillion, South Dakota, United States
 National Maritime Museum in Greenwich, England
 National Media Museum in Bradford, England
 Navi Mumbai Metro, India
 Nonhydrostatic Mesoscale Model, used by the WRF
 Prefix for Italian ships in the Marina Militare
 N-Methylmaleimide, an organic compound
 Nikhil Manipuri Mahasabha, a Hindu nationalist political party
 FAA Location identifier for Naval Air Station Meridian
 National Minority Movement, a British organisation which attempted to organise a united front with the existing trade unions
 N-Methylmorpholine, an organic base in chemistry
 Network-Integrated Multimedia Middleware, a multimedia framework
 N-methyl mesoporphyrin IX, a hemin-related porphyrin